Hyalorista is a genus of moths of the family Crambidae.

Species
Hyalorista exuvialis (Guenée, 1854)
Hyalorista imitans Warren, 1892
Hyalorista limasalis (Walker, 1866)
Hyalorista opalizalis (Guenée, 1854)
Hyalorista taeniolalis (Guenée, 1854)

References

Pyraustinae
Crambidae genera
Taxa named by William Warren (entomologist)